Manrique Larduet Bicet (born July 10, 1996) is a Cuban artistic gymnast. Larduet grew up in Santiago de Cuba, Cuba and is famous for his history-making silver at the 2015 World Artistic Gymnastics Championships. He has also competed at the Pan American Games. At the 2017 Artistic Gymnastics World Championships in Montreal, Quebec, Canada, although he qualified first into the all-around, he had mistakes on floor exercise and pommel horse in the finals, and ended up in fifth place, the winner being Xiao Ruoteng of China.

He has qualified to represent Cuba at the 2020 Summer Olympics in the men's artistic gymnastics all-around event.

References

External links 
 
 
 

1996 births
Living people
Cuban male artistic gymnasts
Gymnasts at the 2016 Summer Olympics
Olympic gymnasts of Cuba
Medalists at the World Artistic Gymnastics Championships
Pan American Games gold medalists for Cuba
Pan American Games silver medalists for Cuba
Pan American Games bronze medalists for Cuba
Pan American Games medalists in gymnastics
Central American and Caribbean Games gold medalists for Cuba
Central American and Caribbean Games silver medalists for Cuba
Central American and Caribbean Games bronze medalists for Cuba
Competitors at the 2014 Central American and Caribbean Games
Gymnasts at the 2015 Pan American Games
Central American and Caribbean Games medalists in gymnastics
Medalists at the 2015 Pan American Games
Sportspeople from Santiago de Cuba
20th-century Cuban people
21st-century Cuban people